Contact Quarterly (CQ) is a contemporary dance magazine established in 1975, with a focus on improvisation and performance. In addition to its periodical publications, the magazine sponsors symposia, workshops, and other programmes to support of contemporary movement arts. It is recognized for its role in supporting the "contact improvisation" dance movement.

Overview 
Contact Quarterly was launched as Contact Newsletter, during a period when "contact improvisation", a particular type of contemporary dance using improvisation, was a growing trend. It was renamed Contact Quarterly in 1975 and was a regularly published national magazine. It "collected impressions and insight into contact as well as announcements for upcoming events". Early issues of the magazine are valued as educational reading for dancers and dance teachers exploring the roots of the contact improvisation movement and the techniques of its originators. The headquarters of the magazine is in Northampton, Massachusetts.

See also
 DanceAbility International
 List of open access journals

References

External links 
 

Quarterly magazines published in the United States
Dance magazines
Magazines established in 1975
English-language magazines
Music magazines published in the United States
Magazines published in Massachusetts